is a professional Japanese baseball player. He plays infielder for the Tohoku Rakuten Golden Eagles.

References 

2001 births
Living people
Baseball people from Nara Prefecture
Japanese baseball players
Nippon Professional Baseball infielders
Tohoku Rakuten Golden Eagles players